Lottery wheeling (also known as lottery system, lottery wheel, lottery wheeling system) is a method of selecting multiple lottery tickets, widely used by individual players and syndicates to secure wins provided they hit some of the drawn numbers. It requires playing with more than one ticket and more numbers than those drawn in the lottery.

Purpose 

If the lottery is pick 6, then a wheeling system can be used in playing with 7 or more numbers. If the lottery is pick 5, then a wheeling system can be used in playing with 6 or more numbers. For example, in a pick 5 lottery, a lottery system can have 9 numbers and a guarantee of 3 if 3, meaning that the player will get a 3-win whenever three of his/her 9 numbers are among the five numbers drawn. In a pick 6 lottery, an example will be a system with, say, 12 numbers and a guarantee of 4 if 5, meaning that the player will get a 4-win whenever five of his/her 12 numbers are among the six numbers drawn. A lottery wheeling system acts as a single ticket in terms of a particular guarantee, but it allows playing with a set of numbers of size larger than the size of the set of numbers drawn in the lottery. For instance, a single ticket in a pick 6 lottery guarantees a 4-win if four of the player's numbers are drawn. A lottery system with, say, 10 numbers and the same guarantee would require at least 20 tickets to be played, so it will be a well-structured set of 20 tickets, giving the same guarantee, that is, a 4-win if 4 of the player's 10 numbers are drawn. Wheeling systems allow the players to play as many numbers as they wish in a well-organized and balanced way. The term "wheeling" comes from the way some systems are constructed; it is a reference to their cyclic nature. This can be illustrated on the following simple wheel construction example, a pick 6, 9 numbers, 4 if 5 guarantee system in 3 combinations, played on the numbers 1-9 (the player can substitute any 9 numbers instead).

This wheeling system has three groups of numbers: A = {1, 2, 3}; B = {4, 5, 6}; and C = {7, 8, 9}. Tickets are formed by the cyclic shifts of the grouping AB (the first ticket); the other two are BC and CA (tickets 3 and 2 respectively). If any 5 of these 9 numbers are drawn, then there will be at least one ticket with 4 of the numbers in it, thereby providing the stated guarantee of a 4-win if 5 of the 9 numbers are drawn. Consider the possible distributions of the 5 numbers drawn among the three groups, and observe that there are always two groups that contain either all 5 or 4 of the 5 numbers drawn. Since any two groups are combined in a ticket, there will always be a 4-win or a 5-win, per the minimum guarantee. Difficulties greatly increase in constructing systems with more numbers and combinations. In mathematics, the study of these objects falls within the branch of combinatorial design.

Players are usually interested in the minimum possible (or minimum known) number of tickets for a given guarantee. A lottery wheeling system has a basic guarantee (as in the examples above), but it also has other, secondary guarantees, which can be observed from the table of wins for the system.

The probability of hitting the jackpot varies between the different lotteries. The popular US lotteries have odds ranging from the astronomical 1 in about 300 million in the double pick multi-state lottery Mega Millions to the fairly good 1 in about 170 thousands in the pick 5, 31 number, Wisconsin Lottery Badger 5. Wheeling systems are usually intended to provide a minimum guaranteed number of wins if some of the drawn numbers are captured in the set of the player's numbers. Lottery Wheels were introduced in the 1970s and have become a popular method of playing. Several "spin off" methods have since become popular, with mixed acceptance.

From a mathematical standpoint 'wheeling' has no impact on the expected value of any given ticket. However, playing a lottery wheel impact the win distribution over time. Playing a lottery wheel gives a steadier stream of wins compared to the same size collection of tickets with randomly chosen numbers on the same set. As an extreme example, there is a wheeling system for the pick 6 6/49 game which always guarantees a 3-win in 163 combinations. Playing such wheel will always guarantee a small return of at least one 3-win, while playing 163 random combinations on all of the 49 numbers of the lottery will not guarantee anything. In fact, playing 163 random combinations could yield zero return on a long stretch of consecutive draws. Because lottery wheels give a steadier stream of wins compared to the same number of random tickets on the same numbers, some players find them an attractive strategy. Regular small wins while waiting for a jackpot seems to be a sought after option for syndicates. Lottery systems are often mis-sold as a part of various lottery strategy related products, usually bundled with lottery prediction software, and various other "tools" which supposedly "improve the odds" or "guarantee profits" in get-rich-quick-schemes. These are often based on mathematically incorrect assumptions and claims, like the Gambler's Fallacy or on plain misunderstanding or misrepresentation of probability theory. A fairly exhaustive list of such products and honest reviews and criticism about each of them is compiled at. 

A list of lotto strategies books, some of which deal with lotto wheeling systems, can be found at. Some of the books mentioned there might be out of print or difficult to find.
Most of the available lotto strategies books can be found at Amazon.com, on search for lottery systems (or lottery wheeling).

Full Wheel 
Full Wheel or full system includes all combinations that can be generated from a set of numbers a player picks, and therefore guarantees a first tier prize if all of the drawn numbers are within the player's set of numbers; it also guarantees a number of lower tier prizes. The only drawback with full wheels is they become fairly expensive with increasing the size of the set of the player's chosen numbers. A player who wishes to play a full wheel with 10 numbers in a pick 6 lottery game will have to play 210 combinations, while a full wheel with 15 numbers in the same lottery will require 5005 combinations! Some lotteries offer system forms. The player can mark 7 to 14 or 15 numbers in one grid.

In a famous occurrence, a Polish-Irish businessman named Stefan Klincewicz bought up 80% of the 1,947,792 combinations available at the Irish Lottery. He and his associates paid less than one million Irish pounds while the jackpot stood at 1.7 million pounds. The syndicate did have a ticket with the winning numbers. However, so did two other players, and the jackpot was split three ways.  With the "Match 4" and "Match 5" prizes, though, Klincewicz's syndicate made a small profit overall.

Abbreviated Wheel 
An Abbreviated Wheel is an economical alternative for a Full Wheel. Although an Abbreviated Wheel does not include all possible combinations of the chosen numbers, it still guarantees at least one winning ticket if some of the numbers drawn are within the player's selection of numbers.

The following is an example of an abbreviated lottery wheeling system for pick-6 with 10 numbers, 4 if 4 guarantee and the minimum possible number of combinations for that guarantee, 20. The original system is given as 20 combinations on the numbers from 1 to 10. The next table gives a possible selection of the player’s numbers and his/her set of tickets, which are obtained after substituting the numbers 1-10 with the player’s numbers.

This example can be used to illustrate the main guarantee of the chosen system (a 4-win if four of the 10 player’s numbers are drawn): Suppose the numbers 7,12,29, and 40 are drawn (these are shaded in the player's tickets), then the system guarantees at least one 4-win, by design. Indeed, it is easy to check that this is so. In fact, in this particular case, the system gives two 4-wins (in rows 13 and 16), and it also gives seven 3-wins (these can be found in tickets 1,2,3,6,10,14, and 15).
 The number of combinations in an Abbreviated Wheel is significantly smaller than the number of combinations in a Full Wheel on the same set of numbers. In the example above, the Abbreviated Wheel for pick-6 lottery with 10 numbers and 4 if 4 guarantee has 20 tickets. A full wheel with 10 numbers requires 210 combinations and has 6 if 6 guarantee.

Lottery wheeling systems have been used by lottery players throughout the world. Full and Abbreviated Wheels are the most popular among different types of lottery wheels. Many lotteries provide the option of playing a full wheel either on a regular type of ticket or on a specially designed one without the need to fill all of the combinations individually.  Several European lottery corporations have gone a step further and have provided the option of playing abbreviated wheels from a pre-approved selection, by using specially designed playing slips which refer to the chosen system by number and do not require filling the individual combinations of the system.

Filtered Wheel 
Filters can further reduce the number of combinations in a Full or Abbreviated Wheel, but they will generally destroy the guarantees of the wheel. For example, a filter can be set to remove combinations with all odd numbers, to balance the amount of odd and even numbers within the combination, etc.

Pick 6, 8 numbers picked, with filters: 2 or 4 even numbers and 2 or 4 low numbers.

1	8	13	16	25	37

1	8	13	16	28	32

1	13	25	28	32	37

8	16	25	28	32	37

A filtered set of combinations can be produced by a program.

Pick 6, 10 numbers wheel, 3 if 3 when 1 or more from 1 to 5  and 1 or more from 6 to 10 and 3 or more from 1 to 10. Here is the result in a usable template.

1	2	3	6	7	10

1	2	4	7	8	9

1	2	5	6	9	10

1	3	4	6	8	9

1	4	5	7	8	10

2	3	4	6	8	10

2	3	5	7	9	10

2	4	5	8	9	10

3	4	5	6	7	8

The goal of filtering a full set is to eliminate combinations that the player does not want to play. Further the obtained wheel can be reduced in size with one or more guarantees. Instead of using a wheel template a player can use a program that filters and reduces the obtained set of combinations respecting a set of conditions.

Key Number Wheel 
Key Number Wheel (or a Power Number Wheel) is a wheel in which one or more numbers (key numbers or power numbers) appear in every combination of the wheel.

Pick 5, 7 numbers wheel, with 2 key numbers (1 and 2), 2 if 2 and 3 if 4 for the full set and 4 if 5 for the filtered set:

1	2	3	4	6

1	2	3	5	7

1	2	4	5	6

1	2	4	6	7

Positional wheel 
A positional wheel allows the player to generally distribute numbers in different positions. The abbreviated positional wheels are mostly very small.

12 numbers, in 4 places or positions, with 2 if 2 and 3 if 4:

1	4	7	10

1	5	8	11

1	6	9	12

2	4	9	11

2	5	7	12

2	6	8	10

3	4	8	12

3	5	9	10

3	6	7	11

See also 
 Lottery payouts

References 

Lottery games